Janik Jay Bachmann (born 6 May 1996) is a German professional footballer who plays as a midfielder for SV Sandhausen.

References

External links
 

1996 births
Living people
People from Groß-Umstadt
Sportspeople from Darmstadt (region)
German footballers
Association football midfielders
Hannover 96 II players
Chemnitzer FC players
Würzburger Kickers players
1. FC Kaiserslautern players
SV Sandhausen players
Regionalliga players
3. Liga players
2. Bundesliga players
Footballers from Hesse